Rowland Allen Shaddick (26 March 1920 – 12 January 1994) was an English cricketer active from 1946 to 1955 who played for Middlesex, Marylebone Cricket Club (MCC) and Free Foresters. He was born in Clapton, London, and died in Enfield, Middlesex.

An amateur cricketer who worked as a doctor, Shaddick appeared in twenty first-class matches as a right-handed batsman who bowled off breaks. He scored 62 runs with a highest score of 12 not out and took 49 wickets with a best performance of 5 for 34 for Free Foresters against Oxford University in 1952. His most successful season was 1947 when he played nine matches and took 29 wickets at an average of 22.20, including 4 for 46 and 4 for 54 for Middlesex against Cambridge University.

References

External links
 
 Rowland Shaddick at CricketArchive

1920 births
1994 deaths
English cricketers
Middlesex cricketers
Marylebone Cricket Club cricketers
Free Foresters cricketers